Goëland was a French fishing trawler that was built in 1906. She was requistioned in the Second World War by the French Navy for use as a watchboat. She was captured by the Kriegsmarine, serving as HS 06 Goëland, and later as the Vorpostenboot V 727 Goëland and later as V 216 Goëland. She was sunk in 1944

Description
The engine was built by Alblasserdam Maschien Fabriek, Alblasserdam, South Holland, Netherlands. It was rated at 60nhp. It drove a single screw propeller.

History
Goëland was built as yard number 180 by Bonn & Mees, Rotterdam, South Holland for F. Courtois & F. Havelaque, Boulogne, Pas-de-Calais, France. She was operated under the management of Auguste Bourgain-Bourgain. By 1918, the Code Letters JLBS had been allocated. By 1920, she had been sold to Victor Fourny, Boulogne. By 1922, she had been sold to the Sociètè Française des Pêcheries à Vapeur, Boulogne. She was operated under the management of Veuve Christiaens & A. Bourgain. Her Code Letters were now OIHT.

Goëland was later sold to the Compagnie Générale Grande Pêche, Fécamp, Seine-Inférieure, France. From 1934, her code letters were FOGY. In 1940, she was requisitioned by the French Navy for uses as a watchboat. She was captured later that year by the Kriegsmarine, and was commissioned on 30 November 1940 as HS 06 Goëland. On 2 May 1942 she was allocated to 7 Vorpostenflotille as the vorpostenboot V 727 Goëland. In 1944, she was reallocated to 2 Vorpostenflotille as V 216 Goëland. She was sunk on 6 August 1944 at Saint-Malo, Ille-et-Vilaine, France.

References

Sources

1906 ships
Ships built in Rotterdam
Steamships of France
Merchant ships of France
World War I merchant ships of France
Auxiliary ships of the French Navy
Steamships of Germany
Auxiliary ships of the Kriegsmarine